Sir Joseph Banks, 1st Baronet,  (19 June 1820) was an English naturalist, botanist, and patron of the natural sciences.

Banks made his name on the 1766 natural-history expedition to Newfoundland and Labrador. He took part in Captain James Cook's first great voyage (1768–1771), visiting Brazil, Tahiti, and after 6 months in New Zealand, Australia, returning to immediate fame. He held the position of president of the Royal Society for over 41 years. He advised King George III on the Royal Botanic Gardens, Kew, and by sending botanists around the world to collect plants, he made Kew the world's leading botanical garden. He is credited for bringing 30,000 plant specimens home with him; amongst them, he was the first European to document 1,400.

Banks advocated British settlement in New South Wales and the colonisation of Australia, as well as the establishment of Botany Bay as a place for the reception of convicts, and advised the British government on all Australian matters. He is credited with introducing the eucalyptus, acacia, and the genus named after him, Banksia, to the Western world. Around 80 species of plants bear his name. He was the leading founder of the African Association and a member of the Society of Dilettanti, which helped to establish the Royal Academy.

Early life

Banks was born in Argyll Street, Soho, London, the son of William Banks, a wealthy Lincolnshire country squire and member of the House of Commons, and his wife Sarah, daughter of William Bate. He was baptised at St James's Church, Piccadilly, on 20 February 1743, Old Style. He had a younger sister, Sarah Sophia Banks, born in 1744.

Education
Banks was educated at Harrow School from the age of nine and then at Eton College from 1756; the boys with whom he attended the school included his future shipmate Constantine Phipps.

As a boy, Banks enjoyed exploring the Lincolnshire countryside and developed a keen interest in nature, history, and botany. When he was 17, he was inoculated with smallpox, but he became ill and did not return to school. In late 1760, he was enrolled as a gentleman-commoner at the University of Oxford. At Oxford, he matriculated at Christ Church, where his studies were largely focussed on natural history rather than the classical curriculum. Determined to receive botanical instruction, he paid the Cambridge botanist Israel Lyons to deliver a series of lectures at Oxford in 1764.

Banks left Oxford for Chelsea in December 1763. He continued to attend the university until 1764, but left that year without taking a degree. His father had died in 1761, so when Banks reached the age of 21, he inherited the large estate of Revesby Abbey, in Lincolnshire, becoming the local squire and magistrate, and dividing his time between Lincolnshire and London. From his mother's house in Chelsea, he kept up his interest in science by attending the Chelsea Physic Garden of the Worshipful Society of Apothecaries and the British Museum, where he met Daniel Solander. He began to make friends among the scientific men of his day and to correspond with Carl Linnaeus, whom he came to know through Solander. As Banks's influence increased, he became an adviser to King George III and urged the monarch to support voyages of discovery to new lands, hoping to indulge his own interest in botany.  He became a Freemason sometime before 1769.

Newfoundland and Labrador
In 1766, Banks was elected to the Royal Society, and in the same year, at 23, he went with Phipps aboard the frigate  to Newfoundland and Labrador with a view to studying their natural history. He made his name by publishing the first Linnean descriptions of the plants and animals of Newfoundland and Labrador. Banks also documented 34 species of birds, including the great auk, which became extinct in 1844. On 7 May, he noted a large number of "penguins" swimming around the ship on the Grand Banks, and a specimen he collected in Chateau Bay, Labrador, was later identified as the great auk.

Endeavour voyage

Banks was appointed to a joint Royal Navy/Royal Society scientific expedition to the South Pacific Ocean on HMS Endeavour, 1768–1771. This was the first of James Cook's voyages of discovery in that region. Banks funded eight others to join him: the Swedish naturalist Daniel Solander, the Finnish naturalist Herman Spöring (who also served as Banks' personal secretary and as a draughtsman), artists Sydney Parkinson and Alexander Buchan, and four servants from his estate: James Roberts, Peter Briscoe, Thomas Richmond, and George Dorlton. In 1771, he was travelling with James Cook and docked in Simon's Town in what is now South Africa. There, he met Christoffel Brand and a friendship started. He was the godfather of Brand's grandson Christoffel Brand.

The voyage went to Brazil, where Banks made the first scientific description of a now common garden plant, Bougainvillea (named after Cook's French counterpart, Louis Antoine de Bougainville), and to other parts of South America. The voyage then progressed to Tahiti (where the transit of Venus was observed, the overt purpose of the mission), then to New Zealand.

From there, it proceeded to the east coast of Australia, where Cook mapped the coastline and made landfall at Botany Bay, then at Round Hill (23-25 May 1770), which is now known as Seventeen Seventy and at Endeavour River (near modern Cooktown) in Queensland, where they spent almost seven weeks ashore while the ship was repaired after becoming holed on the Great Barrier Reef. While they were in Australia, Banks, Daniel Solander, and Finnish botanist Dr Herman Spöring Jr. made the first major collection of Australian flora, describing many species new to science. Almost 800 specimens were illustrated by the artist Sydney Parkinson and appear in Banks' Florilegium, finally published in 35 volumes between 1980 and 1990. Notable also was that during the period when the Endeavour was being repaired, Banks observed a kangaroo, first recorded as "kanguru" on 12 July 1770 in an entry in his diary.

Return home
Banks arrived back in England on 12 July 1771 and immediately became famous. He intended to go with Cook on his second voyage, which began on 13 May 1772, but difficulties arose about Banks' scientific requirements on board Cook's new ship, HMS Resolution. The Admiralty regarded Banks' demands as unacceptable and without prior warning, withdrew his permission to sail. Banks immediately arranged an alternative expedition, and in July 1772, Daniel Solander and he visited the Isle of Wight, the Hebrides, Iceland, and the Orkney Islands, aboard Sir Lawrence. In Iceland, they ascended Mt. Hekla and visited the Great Geyser, and were the first scientific visitors to Staffa in the Inner Hebrides. They returned to London in November, with many botanical specimens, via Edinburgh, where Banks and Solander were interviewed by James Boswell. In 1773, he toured south Wales in the company of artist Paul Sandby. When he settled in London, he began work on his Florilegium. He kept in touch with most of the scientists of his time, was elected a foreign member of the Royal Swedish Academy of Sciences in 1773, and added a fresh interest when he was elected to the Dilettante Society in 1774. He was afterwards secretary of this society from 1778 to 1797. On 30 November 1778, he was elected president of the Royal Society, a position he was to hold with great distinction for over 41 years.

In March 1779, Banks married Dorothea Hugessen, daughter of W. W. Hugessen, and settled in a large house at 32 Soho Square. It continued to be his London residence for the remainder of his life. There, he welcomed the scientists, students, and authors of his period, and many distinguished foreign visitors. His sister Sarah Sophia Banks lived in the house with Banks and his wife. He had as librarian and curator of his collections Solander, Jonas Carlsson Dryander, and Robert Brown in succession.

Also in 1779, Banks took a lease on an estate called Spring Grove, the former residence of Elisha Biscoe (1705–1776), which he eventually bought outright from Biscoe's son, also Elisha, in 1808. The picture shows the house in 1815. Its 34 acres ran along the northern side of the London Road, Isleworth, and contained a natural spring, which was an important attraction to him. Banks spent much time and effort on this secondary home. He steadily created a renowned botanical masterpiece on the estate, achieved primarily with many of the great variety of foreign plants he had collected on his extensive travels around the world, particularly to Australia and the South Seas. The surrounding district became known as Spring Grove.

The house was substantially extended and rebuilt by later owners and is now part of West Thames College.

Banks was made a baronet in 1781, three years after being elected president of the Royal Society. During much of this time, he was an informal adviser to King George III on the Royal Botanic Gardens, Kew, a position that was formalised in 1797. Banks dispatched explorers and botanists to many parts of the world, and through these efforts, Kew Gardens became arguably the pre-eminent botanical gardens in the world, with many species being introduced to Europe through them and through Chelsea Physic Garden and their head gardener John Fairbairn. He directly fostered several famous voyages, including that of George Vancouver to the northeastern Pacific (Pacific Northwest), and William Bligh's voyages (one entailing the infamous mutiny on the Bounty) to transplant breadfruit from the South Pacific to the Caribbean islands. Banks was also a major financial supporter of William Smith in his decade-long efforts to create a geological map of England, the first geological map of an entire country. He also chose Allan Cunningham for voyages to Brazil and the north and northwest coasts of Australia to collect specimens.

Colonisation of New South Wales
Banks's own time in Australia, however, led to his interest in the British colonisation of that continent. He was to be the greatest proponent of settlement in New South Wales. A genus of the Proteaceae was named in his honour as Banksia. In 1779, Banks, giving evidence before a committee of the House of Commons, had stated that in his opinion the place most eligible for the reception of convicts "was Botany Bay, on the coast of New Holland", on the general grounds that, "it was not to be doubted that a Tract of Land such as New Holland, which was larger than the whole of Europe, would furnish Matter of advantageous Return".

Although Banks remained uninvolved in these colonies in a hands on manner, he was, nonetheless, the general adviser to the government on all Australian matters for twenty years. He arranged that a large number of useful trees and plants should be sent out in the supply ship , which was unfortunately wrecked, as well as other ships; many of these were supplied by Hugh Ronalds from his nursery in Brentford. Every vessel that came from New South Wales brought plants or animals or geological and other specimens to Banks. He was continually called on for help in developing the agriculture and trade of the colony, and his influence was used in connection with the sending out of early free settlers, one of whom, a young gardener George Suttor, later wrote a memoir of Banks. The three earliest governors of the colony, Arthur Phillip, John Hunter, and Philip Gidley King, were in continual correspondence with him. Banks produced a significant body of papers, including one of the earliest Aboriginal Australian words lists compiled by a European. Bligh was also appointed governor of New South Wales on Banks's recommendation. Banks followed the explorations of Matthew Flinders, George Bass, and Lieutenant James Grant, and among his paid helpers were George Caley, Robert Brown, and Allan Cunningham.

However, Banks backed William Bligh to be installed as the new governor of New South Wales and to crack down on the New South Wales Corps (or Rum Corps), which made a fortune on the trading of rum. This brought him in direct confrontation with post-Rum Rebellion de facto leaders such as John Macarthur and George Johnston. This backing led to the Rum Rebellion in Sydney, whereby the governor was overthrown by the two men. This became an embarrassment for Sir Joseph Banks, also, because years earlier, he campaigned that John Macarthur not be granted  of land near Sydney in the cow pastures, which was later granted by Lord Camden. The next governor, Lachlan Macquarie, was asked to arrest Macarthur and Johnston, only to realise that they had left Sydney for London to defend themselves. He was humiliated that Macarthur and Johnston were acquitted from all charges in London and both later returned to Sydney.

Later life

Banks met the young Alexander von Humboldt in 1790, when Banks was already the president of the Royal Society. Before Humboldt and his scientific travel companion and collaborator Aimé Bonpland left for what became a five-year journal of exploration and discovery, Humboldt requested a British passport for Bonpland, should the two encounter British warships. On their travels, Humboldt arranged for specimens be sent to Banks, should they be seized by the British.  Banks and Humboldt remained in touch until Banks's death, aiding Humboldt by mobilising his wide network of scientific contacts to forward information to the great German scientist. Both men believed in the internationalism of science.

Banks was elected a member of the American Philosophical Society in 1787 and a foreign honorary member of the American Academy of Arts and Sciences in 1788. Among other activities, Banks found time to serve as a trustee of the British Museum for 42 years. He was high sheriff of Lincolnshire in 1794.

He worked with Sir George Staunton in producing the official account of the British mission to the Chinese Imperial court. This diplomatic and trade mission was headed by George, Earl Macartney. Although the Macartney Embassy returned to London without obtaining any concession from China, the mission could have been termed a success because it brought back detailed observations. This multivolume work was taken chiefly from the papers of Lord Macartney and from the papers of Sir Erasmus Gower, who was commander of the expedition. Banks was responsible for selecting and arranging engraving of the illustrations in this official record.

Banks was invested as a Knight of the Order of the Bath (KB) on 1 July 1795, which became Knight Grand Cross (GCB) when the order was restructured in 1815.

Banks was a large landowner and activist encloser, drainer and ‘improver’ in Fens at Revesby.

Banks's health began to fail early in the 19th century and he suffered from gout every winter. After 1805, he practically lost the use of his legs and had to be wheeled to his meetings in a chair, but his mind remained as vigorous as ever. He had been a member of the Society of Antiquaries nearly all his life, and he developed an interest in archaeology in his later years. In 1807, William Kerr named the Lady Banks climbing rose after Banks's wife.  Banks was made an honorary founding member of the Wernerian Natural History Society of Edinburgh in 1808. In 1809, he became associated member of the Royal Institute of the Netherlands. In 1809, his friend Alexander Henry dedicated his travel book to him. In May 1820, he forwarded his resignation as president of the Royal Society, but withdrew it at the request of the council. In 1819, Fabian Gottlieb von Bellingshausen on his First Russian Antarctic Expedition, briefly stopped in England and met Joseph Banks. Banks had sailed with James Cook 50 years earlier and supplied the Russians with books and charts for their expedition. He died on 19 June 1820 in Spring Grove House, Isleworth, London, and was buried at St Leonard's Church, Heston. Lady Banks survived him, but they had no children.

Legacy 

Banks was a major supporter of the internationalist nature of science, being actively involved both in keeping open the lines of communication with continental scientists during the Napoleonic Wars, and in introducing the British people to the wonders of the wider world. He was honoured with many place names in the South Pacific: Banks Peninsula on the South Island, New Zealand; the Banks Islands in modern-day Vanuatu; the Banks Strait between Tasmania and the Furneaux Islands; Banks Island in the Northwest Territories, Canada; and the Sir Joseph Banks Group in South Australia.

The Canberra suburb of Banks, the electoral Division of Banks, and the Sydney suburbs of Bankstown, Banksia, and Banksmeadow are all named after him, as is the northern headland of Botany Bay, Cape Banks.

An image of Banks was featured on the paper $5 Australian banknote from its introduction in 1967 before it was replaced by the later polymer currency.

In 1986, Banks was honoured by his portrait being depicted on a postage stamp issued by Australia Post.

In Lincoln, England, the Sir Joseph Banks Conservatory was constructed in 1989 at The Lawn, Lincoln; its tropical hot house had numerous plants related to Banks's voyages, with samples from across the world, including Australia. The conservatory was moved to Woodside Wildlife Park in 2016 and has been named 'Endeavour'.  A plaque was installed in Lincoln Cathedral in his honour. In Boston, Lincolnshire, Banks was recorder for the town. His portrait, painted in 1814 by Thomas Phillips, was commissioned by the Corporation of Boston, as a tribute to one whose 'judicious and active exertions improved and enriched this borough and neighbourhood'. It cost them 100 guineas. The portrait is now hanging in the Council Chamber of the Guildhall Museum.

The Sir Joseph Banks Centre is located in Horncastle, Lincolnshire, housed in a Grade II listed building, which was recently restored by the Heritage Trust of Lincolnshire to celebrate Banks' life. Horncastle is located a few miles from Banks' Revesby estate and the naturalist was the town's lord of the manor. The centre is located on Bridge Street. It boasts research facilities, historic links to Australia, and a garden in which rare plants can be viewed and purchased. 

Situated in the Sydney suburb of Revesby, Sir Joseph Banks High School is a NSW government school named after Banks.

At the 2011 Chelsea Flower Show, an exhibition garden celebrated the historic link between Banks and the botanical discoveries of flora and fauna on his journey through South America, Tahiti, New Zealand, and eventually Australia on Captain Cook's ship Endeavour. The competition garden was the entry of Melbourne's Royal Botanic Gardens with an Australian theme. It was based on the metaphorical journey of water through the continent, related to the award-winning Australian Garden at the Royal Botanic Gardens, Cranbourne. The design won a gold medal.

In 1911, London County Council marked Banks' house at 32 Soho Square with a blue plaque. This was replaced in 1938 with a rectangular stone plaque commemorating Banks and botanists David Don and Robert Brown and meetings of the Linnean Society.

Banks appears in the historical novel Mutiny on the Bounty, by Charles Nordhoff and James Norman Hall. He appears briefly as a contact with British naval intelligence in the historical novel Post Captain, from the Aubrey–Maturin series by Patrick O'Brian. He is also featured in Elizabeth Gilbert's 2013 best-selling novel, The Signature of All Things, and is a major character in Martin Davies' 2005 novel The Conjuror's Bird.

A secondary school opened in Perth, Western Australia in 2015 named Joseph Banks Secondary College.

Dispersal of Banks papers
Following Banks's death in 1820 a "treasure-trove of letters and papers" was passed to Sir Edward Knatchbull, his wife's nephew. In 1828 the latter passed bound volumes of foreign correspondence to the British Library but retained the rest of the papers in the expectation that an official biography would be written. After the death of Knatchbull and his wife, the letters and papers were passed on to their son Edward Knatchbull Hugesson, 1st Baron Brabourne, who offered to sell them to the British Museum. However, in 1884 it declined to purchase them. Following that "notorious" decision the Agent General of New South Wales, Sir Saul Samuel, issued instructions for the purchase of a large portion of the papers, which now form part of the State Library of New South Wales's Brabourne Collection. The "large quantities of papers" which remained were then auctioned off at Sotheby's in London in March and April 1886. One of the successful bidders was E. A. Petherick. Many of those are now in the Petherick Collection at the National Library of Australia. During the twentieth century the National Library continued to purchase Banks's letters and papers when they came on the market.

Online archive
In his Endeavour journal, Banks recorded 30 years of his life. Letters, invoices, maps, regalia, and watercolour drawings have now been digitised on the State Library of NSW website. This rich research and educational tool accesses 8800 high-quality digital images.

See also
 European and American voyages of scientific exploration
 List of Notable Freemasons
 History of Australia
 List of presidents of the Royal Society

References

Cited sources

Further reading

Primary resources
Sutro Library, a branch of the California State Library. Sir Joseph Banks Collection, 1770-1812.
State Library of New South Wales. Papers of Sir Joseph Banks and The Endeavour Journal of Joseph Banks, 1768–1771
National Library of Australia (NLA). Papers of Sir Joseph Banks
Royal Geographical Society of South Australia Journal of a voyage to Newfoundland and Labrador commencing 7 April and ending 17 November 1766
 Notebooks containing vocabularies of Tahitian languages and observations collected by Banks are held by SOAS Special Collections. Digitised items from the collection are available to view online here.

Secondary resources
 Cameron, H. C. (1952) Sir Joseph Banks, K.B., P.R.S.; the Autocrat of the Philosophers, Batchworth Press.
 Carter, Harold Burnell (1988) Sir Joseph Banks, 1743–1820 London: British Museum of Natural History ;
 
Dawson, W. R. (ed) (1958) The Banks Letters, University of London.
 Durt, Tania (2007) "Joseph Banks", pp. 173–181 in The Great Naturalists, edited by Robert Huxley. London: Thames & Hudson with the Natural History Museum.
Duyker, Edward (1998) Nature's Argonaut: Daniel Solander 1733-1782: Naturalist and Voyager with Cook and Banks. Melbourne University Press. 
 Marshall, John Braybrooke. "Daniel Carl Solander, Friend, Librarian and Assistant to Sir Joseph Banks." Archives of Natural History 11.3 (1984): 451–456.
Duyker, Edward & Tingbrand, Per (ed. & trans) (1995) Daniel Solander: Collected Correspondence 1753–1782, Melbourne University Press, Melbourne, pp. 466,   Scandinavian University Press, Oslo, 1995, pp. 466, 
 Fara, Patricia (2004) Sex, Botany & Empire: The Story Of Carl Linnaeus And Joseph Banks. New York: Columbia University Press 
 Gascoigne, John (1994) Joseph Banks and the English Enlightenment: Useful Knowledge and Polite Culture Cambridge: Cambridge University Press 
 Gascoigne, John (1998) Science in the Service of Empire: Joseph Banks, The British State and the Uses of Science in the Age of Revolution. Cambridge: Cambridge University Press 
, Volume I, Volume II-III
 Kryza, Frank T. (207) The Race to Timbuktu: In Search of Africa's City of Gold. New York: HarperCollins 
Lysaght, A. M. (1971). Joseph Banks in Newfoundland and Labrador, 1766; his diary, manuscripts, and collections. Faber and Faber, London. ;
Mackaness, G. (1936) Sir Joseph Banks. His Relations with Australia, University of Sydney
Maiden, J. H. (1909) Sir Joseph Banks: The “Father of Australia”.  Kegan Paul.

 O'Brian, Patrick 1993 Joseph Banks: A Life. London: David R. Godine, 1993. , reprinted by University of Chicago Press, 1997 
 ——— 1987 Sir Joseph Banks London: Harvill Press. 
 Smith, Edward (1911) Life of Sir Joseph Banks: With Some Notices of his Friends and Contemporaries.  John Lane.

Select unpublished monographs

 Duncan, A. (1821) A Short Account of the Life of the Right Honourable Sir Joseph Banks, University of Edinburgh.
 Gilbert, L. (1962) Botanical Investigation of Eastern Seaboard Australia, 1788–1810, B.A. thesis, University of New England, Australia.

Fiction
Novels based on a mix of historical fact and conjecture about Banks' early life include:

 Davies, Martin (2005) The Conjurer's Bird New York: Shaye Areheart/Random House.

External links

 
 Journal of the Right Hon. Sir Joseph Banks during Captain Cook's first voyage in H.M.S. Endeavour in 1768–71 to Terra del Fuego, Otahite, New Zealand, Australia, the Dutch East Indies, etc. Joseph Banks and J. D. Hooker. Macmillan, 1896.
 Biography at the Dictionary of Canadian Biography Online
 Correspondence concerning Iceland: written to Sir Joseph Banks, 1772–1818, from the University of Wisconsin Digital Collections
 Lovell, Jennifer. "A Bath Butterfly Botany and Eighteenth Century Sexual Politics." National Library of Australia News 15.7 (April 2005).
 Sir Joseph Banks Society. "Archive of Joseph Banks related material"
 British Museum: Bronze portrait bust of Sir Joseph Banks by Anne Seymour Damer (1814)
 BBC: Historic figures; BBC Radio 4:  Science at Sea
 
 Papers of Sir Joseph Banks – State Library of New South Wales
 William Bligh's letters to Sir Joseph Banks concerning the first Breadfruit Expedition
 Sir Joseph Banks papers (MS 58). Manuscripts and Archives, Yale University Library.

English botanists
English explorers
English naturalists
1743 births
1820 deaths
Alumni of Christ Church, Oxford
Banks, Joseph, 1st Baronet
Botanical collectors active in Australia
Botanists active in New Zealand
Botanists active in North America
Botanists active in South America
Botanists active in the Pacific
English explorers of the Pacific
Explorers of Australia
Freemasons of the Premier Grand Lodge of England
Fellows of the American Academy of Arts and Sciences
Fellows of the Royal Society
Presidents of the Royal Society
Fellows of the Society of Antiquaries of London
High Sheriffs of Lincolnshire
Royal Botanic Gardens, Kew
Soho Square
Trustees of the British Museum
Knights Grand Cross of the Order of the Bath
Members of the Royal Netherlands Academy of Arts and Sciences
Members of the Royal Swedish Academy of Sciences
People educated at Eton College
People educated at Harrow School
18th-century British botanists
18th-century English people
18th-century explorers
People from East Lindsey District
James Cook
People from Soho
Members of the American Philosophical Society
Members of the Göttingen Academy of Sciences and Humanities